The Manal Aru massacres of 1984 refers to a series of massacres of Sri Lankan Tamil civilians by the Sri Lankan military across numerous traditional Tamil villages in the Manal Aru region which spans across the Mullaitivu and Trincomalee districts. The motive behind the massacres were to drive out the local Tamil population from their villages, for colonization of Sinhala settlers.

Over the period from 1 December 1984 till 15 December 1984 the area surrounding the region that connects Mullaithivu to Trincomalee saw three well planned massacres, property destruction and forced eviction of Tamils from this region by the Sri Lankan military. The result was that the people who were expelled remained and still remain uprooted from their land.

State aided Sinhala colonization of Tamil areas
The Mullaitivu and Trincomalee Districts were dotted with what have been traditional Tamil farming and fishing villages for generations. It was interspersed with small and large farms owned by Tamils or held on long lease by Tamil-owned business enterprises. Among the large farms were: Navalar farm, Ceylon Theatres farm, Kent farm, Railway Group Farm, Postmaster Group Farm and Dollar Farm. Kent and Dollar farms were later used to rehabilitate the hill country victims of the 1977 anti-Tamil pogrom.

Throughout the 1980s the Sri Lankan government conspired many schemes to grab the lands of Tamils, and settle them with Sinhalese people. The deliberate and coordinated attacks on Tamil villages, however began after the 1983 Anti-Tamil pogrom in which more than 3000 ethnic Tamils were wiped out and hundreds of thousands were forced to flee the island.

The Yan Oya settlement was one such, aimed at breaking the territorial contiguity of Tamil Eelam, the traditional homeland of Sri Lankan Tamils, between Trincomalee and Mullaitivu. The Yan Oya settlement scheme was administered by the Sri Lankan minister of Sinhala ethnicity Lalith Athulathmudali backed by President J.R. Jayewardene.

In November 1984, alleging Tamils as terrorists, the Superintendent of Police in Vauvuniya Arthur Herath raided and drove away the residents of Kent and Dollar Farm. Subsequently, Sinhala ex-convicts and prisoners were settled there and armed. Next, the nearby villages of Kokkilai, Manal Aru, Kokkuthoduvai, Alampil, Nayaru and Kumulamunai were targeted in Mullaitivu District. The historic Tamil villages of Amaravayal and Thennamarwadi in Trincomalee District was also attacked with the objective of ethnic cleansing of Tamils.

Massacres

Manal Aru
On 03.12.1984, Sri Lankan military rounded up Manal Aru area and fired randomly at the civilians. Civilians from Manal Aru were chased away by the Sri Lankan military and their houses were set on fire. People who have lived in the villages for generations were thus displaced. Many civilians were killed including women and children. Hundreds of families were displaced from these areas. Sinhalese were settled in these villages later.

Army officers either visited or sent messages to village elders informing them of an impending attack on their villages and advised them to leave.  They also used harassment - theft, assault, kidnapping and rape. The harassment was followed by direct onslaught.

Othiyamalai
Another instance of the harassment of the Tamils was the massacre at Othiyamalai during the succeeding months where more than 25 Tamils were killed by the army. TULF representatives who took part in the Indian brokered APC talks raised the events in Manal Aru with the government. They were told that the Sinhalese were being settled as part of a security cordon.

Amaravayal 
Amarivayal is an ancient Tamil village in the north of Trincomalee district. It lies close to Padaviya. The village was neglected by the state and its inhabitants were harassed by Sinhala colonists who wanted to grab their farmland. People of the village received a message that, unless they left the village immediately, they would be attacked by the Sinhalese. N.Vijayaratnam in his book 'Manal Aru' describes the events:

Thennamarawadi
In December 1984, Soldiers and Sinhalese mobs invaded the village of Thennamarawadi variety of weapons, knives, axes, crowbars, clubs and guns. About 200 families lived in Thenaimarawadi at that time. They fled into the forest. The mob set fire to their huts and destroyed everything they could lay their hands on. The mob returned again the next day. They searched the forest for Tamils. They caught a few Tamils and soldiers shot them dead.  Youths were lined up and shot. Women were also raped.

On the third day, 4 December, residents of Thenaimarawadi began their journey to safety; they walked through the forest for four days and reached Mulliyavalai in the Mullaitivu district.  They built temporary sheds and stayed there.  They named their new settlement Ponnagar meaning Golden Town.  They have lived there for the past 20 years.

Kokkilai and other coastal villages

Colonization and forced eviction attempts in traditional Tamil fishing villages by the Sri Lankan military culminated in to a series of massacres that killed hundreds of Tamils which included 31 women and 21 children.

Aftermath
The Tamil community from this region never returned to its original prosperity. Similar treatment was meted out to numerous traditional villages in the Batticaloa, Ampara, Vavunia and Mannar districts.

In December 1984, the Liberation Tigers of Tamil Eelam reprised these colonization attempts by attacking these newly established colonies in North-East which were heavily protected by Sri Lankan military and Sri Lankan Home Guards who had earlier ethnically cleansed the native Tamil population from these villages.

Following the recapture of the North and East by Government forces, the land border between Mullaitivu District and Trincomalee District were once again colonized with Sinhalese settlers in what were traditionally Tamil lands. Sinhalese were settled in traditionally Tamil land, given land, money to build homes and security provided by the Special Task Force. As a result, the demographics of the region had been significantly altered and a new division called the Weli Oya Divisional Secretariat (a Sinhalese corruption of the Tamil term "Manal Aru") was carved in the southern parts of the Mullaitivu district. Today the majority of the population in the area is Sinhalese while Tamils have been systematically denied any claim to their lands.

See also
 Sri Lankan state sponsored colonisation schemes
 1984 Kokkilai massacre

References

1984 crimes in Sri Lanka
Massacres in 1984
Attacks on civilians attributed to the Sri Lanka Army
Massacres in Sri Lanka
Mass murder of Sri Lankan Tamils
Terrorist incidents in Sri Lanka in 1984
November 1984 events in Asia
December 1984 events in Asia